The 1977 Lehigh Engineers football team represented Lehigh University during the 1977 NCAA Division II football season, and completed the 94th season of Engineers football. The Engineers played their home games at Taylor Stadium in Bethlehem, Pennsylvania. The 1977 team came off a 6–5 record from the previous season. The team was led by coach John Whitehead. The team finished the regular season with a 9–2 record and made the NCAA Division II playoffs. The Engineers defeated the Jacksonville State Gamecocks 33–0 in the National Championship Game en route to the program's first NCAA Division II Football Championship.

Schedule

References

Lehigh
Lehigh Mountain Hawks football seasons
NCAA Division II Football Champions
Lehigh Engineers football